Lake Harding, also known as Bartlett's Ferry Lake, is a  reservoir on the Chattahoochee River.

The lake is formed by Bartlett's Ferry Dam, and the lake is located in Harris County, Georgia with some portions of the lake going into Alabama.

The lake was originally built by the Columbus Power Company in 1926 to generate hydroelectric power. The lake was named after R.M. Harding, a power company official. The dam and lake were bought by Georgia Power in 1930. Lake Harding has become a popular recreational area with local residents, many of whom have built lake homes along the well-developed shoreline. A major tributary of the lake is Halawakee Creek.

Lake Harding features several islands. One of the most notable is Huston's Island, which contains the ruins of an old lake house.

Lake Harding is the practice site of the Auburn University Club Rowing Team. The team can frequently be seen practicing on early weekday mornings.

References

External links
Lake Harding Community

 Auburn University Rowing Club 
 Bartlett's Ferry Dam: Antioch Baptist Church historical marker
Reviews of Barlett's Ferry Dam For Cleanliness

LHarding
Protected areas of Harris County, Georgia
Bodies of water of Lee County, Alabama
Harding
Harding
Dams in Georgia (U.S. state)
Georgia Power dams
Dams completed in 1926
Bodies of water of Harris County, Georgia
1926 establishments in Alabama
1926 establishments in Georgia (U.S. state)